Pedicab Driver is a 1989 Hong Kong martial arts film directed by and starring Sammo Hung, who portrays the leader of a crew of cycle rickshaw drivers in 1930s Macau. The movie features guest appearances by Eric Tsang, Corey Yuen and Lau Kar-leung. Warner Bros. has included the film in the catalogue of Warner Archive Collection.

Plot
Lo Tung and his friend Malted Candy are pedicab drivers working on the streets of Macau. Lo Tung falls in love with a baker named Ping and Malted Candy falls in love with a prostitute named Hsaio Tsui. The problem is that both of the objects of their affections are working under cruel and lecherous bosses. The pair must somehow find a way to win the ladies' hearts and free them from their unpleasant jobs.

Cast and roles
 Sammo Hung - Lo Tung
 Lau Kar-leung - Boss of Gambling House (as Kar Leung-Lau) 
 Max Mok - Mai Chien-Tang / Malted Candy
 Chan Lung - Coolie
 Alfred Cheung - Jewelry Store Owner
 Billy Chow - Master 5's Man
 Chung Fat - Thug
 Maria Cordero - Auntie
 Lam Ching-ying - Uncle Sheng
 Billy Lau - Tan
 Nina Li Chi - Ping
 Lowell Lo - Shan Cha Cake
 Eddie Maher - Thug
 Mang Hoi - Rice Pudding
 John Shum - Master 5
 Sun Yueh - Fang
 Eric Tsang - Man with cleaver
 Dick Wei - Wei
 Manfred Wong - Pork bun seller
 Corey Yuen - Coolie (as Kwai Yuen)
 Fennie Yuen - Hsiao-Tsui
 James Mou - Keung
 Hsiao Hou - Master Five's Thug

Reception

Box office
Pedicab Driver grossed  $14,784,774 HKD at the Hong Kong box office.

In 2014, Time Out polled several film critics, directors, actors and stunt actors to list their top action films. Pedicab Driver was listed at 66th place on this list.

Availability
Long out-of-print on VHS and LD, it's now currently available on DVD through Warner Archive.

See also 
 List of films set in Macau

References

External links 
 Pedicab Driver at Hong Kong Cinemagic
 
 

1989 films
1989 action comedy films
1989 martial arts films
Hong Kong action comedy films
1980s Cantonese-language films
Hong Kong martial arts comedy films
Kung fu films
Films set in Macau
Films set in the 1930s
Films directed by Sammo Hung
1980s Hong Kong films